Dabata (Dabaata) is a rural locality (an ulus) in Zaigrayevsky District, Republic of Buryatia, Russia. The population was 100 as of 2010. There are 18 streets.

Geography 
Dabata is located 40 km northwest of Zaigrayevo (the district's administrative centre) by road. Erkhirik is the nearest rural locality.

References 

Rural localities in Zaigrayevsky District